The 1901 Ulster Senior Hurling Championship was the inaugural edition of the annual Ulster Senior Hurling Championship held under the auspices of the Ulster GAA. The Championship consisted of a single match between Antrim and Derry, the only entrants.

Antrim had competed in the previous year's All-Ireland Senior Hurling Championship having emerged from Ulster unchallenged. As a consequence, Antrim were treated as defending Ulster Champions despite no matches taking place.

Antrim emerged victorious by 41 points to 12. The exact breakdown of the final score has been lost to history. Antrim advanced to the semifinal of the 1901 All-Ireland Senior Hurling Championship where they were defeated by Wexford.

Teams

Bracket

Final

References

External links 
 Ulster GAA website

Ulster Hurling Senior
Ulster Senior Hurling Championship